is a best of album released by the Japanese singer-songwriter Kohmi Hirose on November 11, 1998. The album is a compilation of her first 13 singles, most of which were written for the advertising campaigns of Alpen, a Japanese winter sporting goods store. Love Winters is Hirose's most successful album, reaching number 2 on the Oricon's Weekly Album charts, 27 for the 1998 End-of-Year Album charts, and selling over 2.4 million copies.

Track list

References

1998 compilation albums